William Tulloch Paterson (born 3 June 1945) is a Scottish actor with a career in theatre, film, television and radio. Throughout his career he has appeared regularly in radio drama and provided the narration for a large number of documentaries. He has appeared in films and TV series including Comfort and Joy (1984), Auf Wiedersehen, Pet (1986), Truly, Madly, Deeply (1990), Wives and Daughters (1999), Sea of Souls (2004–2007), Amazing Grace (2006), Miss Potter (2006), Little Dorrit (2008), Doctor Who (2010), Outlander (2014), Fleabag (2016–2019), Inside No. 9 (2018), Good Omens (2019), and Brassic (2020). He is a recipient of the Lifetime Achievement Award of the Scottish BAFTAs.

Early life 
William Tulloch Paterson was born in Glasgow on 3 June 1945. Paterson was raised in Dennistoun by his father, a plumber, and his mother, a hairdresser. He states that his interest in acting began with a school trip to the Citizens Theatre in the Gorbals in 1961. However, after school he chose to initially pursue a career based on an interest in architecture and spent three years as a quantity surveyor's apprentice before deciding to attend the Royal Scottish Academy of Music and Drama.

Career

1967–1977: Theatre debut and early roles

Paterson made his professional acting debut in 1967, appearing alongside Leonard Rossiter in Bertolt Brecht's The Resistible Rise of Arturo Ui at the Glasgow Citizens Theatre. In 1970, Paterson joined the Citizens' Theatre for Youth. He remained there as an actor and assistant director until 1972, when he left to appear with Billy Connolly in the musical comedy The Great Northern Welly Boot Show at the Edinburgh Festival in 1972. Paterson would work with Connolly again, some years later, when he performed in Connolly's play .  After having seen Paterson perform at the Festival, John McGrath invited him to join his theatre company, 7:84, touring the United Kingdom and Europe with plays such as The Cheviot, the Stag, and the Black Black Oil. He was a founding member of 7:84, and made his London debut in 1976 with the company. He appeared in the Edinburgh Festival and London with John Byrne's first play, Writer's Cramp.

1978–1989: TV and film debuts
He first appeared in the West End when he took over the lead role in Whose Life Is It Anyway? at the Savoy Theatre in 1979. Paterson's career began to centre as much on television than the theatre. His first appearances in 1978 were as a police Sergeant of Scotland Yard in The Odd Job and then in BAFTA award winning drama Licking Hitler. He then played King James in the UK television serial Will Shakespeare the same year. Paterson would later recall that the biggest regret of his career was during this period, when in 1978 he failed to attend an audition for a role in the film Alien. He provided the voice of the Assistant Arcturan Pilot in Episode 7 of the original BBC Radio 4 version of The Hitchhiker's Guide to the Galaxy in 1978. He played Lopakhin in the BBC production of The Cherry Orchard in 1981. Paterson did not, however, entirely neglect the theatre, and in 1982, he was nominated for a Laurence Olivier Award for his performance as Schweyk in another Brecht play, Schweik in the Second World War at the National Theatre. He was in the original National Theatre production of Guys and Dolls (1982).

The early 1980s also saw Paterson beginning to appear in films, including The Killing Fields, Comfort and Joy and A Private Function (all 1984). Other film credits include Dutch Girls (1985) and The Adventures of Baron Munchausen (1987).

In television, his extensive and award-winning TV career includes a memorable portrayal of property villain Ally Fraser in series 2 of Auf Wiedersehen, Pet (1986). He also appeared in Smiley's People (1982), The Singing Detective (1986), Traffik (1988).

1990–2009: Career actor

Paterson performed in Death and the Maiden at the Royal Court and Duke of York's (1991–92). Other theatre roles in this period include Ivanov at the Almeida, London and Maly Theatre, Moscow (1997). 

In 1990, he performed the role of Mr Jenkins, father to a child who his attached in The Witches (1990). He went on to act in Truly, Madly, Deeply (1990), Chaplin (1992), Sir Ian McKellen's Richard III (1995). In 1997, he appeared as Brian, a cafe owner who knows the Spice Girls, in Spice World. He also performed in The Crow Road (1996), a miniseries from the novel by Iain Banks and Doctor Zhivago (2002).

He later performed in the films Bright Young Things (2003), Miss Potter (2006), How to Lose Friends & Alienate People (2008) and Creation (2009). In television, much of his later work has been for the BBC, starring as Dr Douglas Monaghan in three seasons of the supernatural drama series Sea of Souls (2004-2007). He also played the role of Dr Gibson in the 1999 production of Wives and Daughters, and appeared in the 2008 BBC production of the Charles Dickens novel Little Dorrit as Mr Meagles, as DS Box in the first series of Criminal Justice (2008), and as Dr James Niven in Spanish Flu: The Forgotten Fallen. 

Paterson has also narrated for various television and radio programmes. In 2005, he would take a  role as Rob McKenna, a lorry driver and unknowing Rain God, in Fits the 19th, 20th, and 22nd of The Hitchhiker's Guide to the Galaxy: Quandary Phase. In 2003, Paterson began broadcasting radio stories about his childhood in Glasgow, Tales From the Back Green on BBC Scotland, which led to them being published by Hodder in 2008 and appearances at many book festivals throughout the UK. He narrated the 2009 BBC TV programme 1929 – The Great Crash which recalled the Wall Street Crash of 1929 and compared it to the recent financial turmoil of 2008. From 2009 to 2010, he appeared as George Castle, the head of the CPS in Law & Order: UK. He also played the key role of SIS Chief Percy Alleline in the 2009 BBC Radio 4 version of Tinker Tailor Soldier Spy.

In 2010, Paterson starred in Doctor Who as Professor Edwin Bracewell, in the episode "Victory of the Daleks", with his character making a second appearance in the opening half of the season finale, "The Pandorica Opens". Later in the year, Paterson narrated the BBC Four wildlife documentary Birds Britannia.

2011–2022: TV, Film and Radio
In 2011, Paterson starred in Fast Freddie, The Widow and Me. His most recent theatre is Earthquakes in London at the National Theatre in the summer of 2010. He also narrated the BBC's annual coverage of the Royal Edinburgh Military Tattoo and in 2013 appeared as Adam Smith in The Low Road at the Royal Court. 

Paterson played lawyer Ned Gowan in the 2014 Starz period TV series, Outlander. In 2014, Paterson landed a part as Douglas Henshall's father in TV series Shetland.

In 2015, he starred alongside Brian Cox in a performance of Waiting for Godot at the Royal Lyceum Theatre. In 2015, Paterson was presented with the lifetime achievement of the Scottish BAFTAs.

In 2016, he narrated The Farmers' Country Showdown, a series for the BBC following the agricultural show season and broadcast early in 2017. In 2016, Paterson performed with his friend Simon Callow in The Rebel. He also appeared as the Scottish character Private Frazer in the remake film Dad's Army.

Beginning with the first season in 2016 and ending with the second season in 2019, Paterson played the father of the main character and her sister in the British TV show Fleabag. In 2019, Paterson also performed in the four-part BBC drama Guilt.

In 2022, Paterson performed in the fantasy drama House of the Dragon as the character Lord Lyman Beesbury. He is the narrator of the British TV show The Repair Shop.

Personal life 
In 1980, while filming The Lost Tribe, Paterson purchased a holiday home in Fordyce with fellow actor Miriam Margolyes.

In 1984, Paterson married German stage designer Hildegard Bechtler. They have a son and daughter. Since leaving Glasgow he has spent much of his life living in London and currently resides in North London near Tufnell Park.

Paterson has published a series of book stories based on his childhood in Glasgow entitled Tales From The Back Green.

Filmography

Notes

References

External links 
 
 
 
 Playback/Law & Order Images of Bill Paterson

1945 births
Living people
Male actors from Glasgow
Alumni of the Royal Conservatoire of Scotland
Scottish male film actors
Scottish male stage actors
Scottish male television actors
Scottish male voice actors